Arthur Franklin Raper (8 November 1899 – 10 August 1979) was an American sociologist. He is best known for his research on lynching, sharecropping, and rural development.

Life and career
Raper grew up in Davidson County, North Carolina and attended the University of North Carolina at Chapel Hill. He received an M.A. in Sociology from Vanderbilt University in Nashville, Tennessee. In 1925, he started his PhD at Chapel Hill, under the direction of Howard W. Odum, and completed it in 1931.

In 1926, he worked for the Commission on Interracial Cooperation with Will W. Alexander in Atlanta, Georgia. He later taught at Agnes Scott College in Decatur, Georgia. In 1927 he produced a report on the conditions of African Americans in Tampa, Florida with Benjamin Elijah Mays.

In 1939, he resigned after a furor over taking his students to visit the Tuskegee Institute. He studied and wrote about sharecropping in Macon County and Greene County. He exposed sharecropping as exploitative.  His papers are in the Southern Historical Collection at the University of North Carolina, Chapel Hill Library; four of his books were reviewed by The New York Times.

A collection of Raper's materials are housed at the Special Collections Research Center at Fenwick Library at George Mason University.

Bibliography
Preface to Peasantry (University of North Carolina Press, 1936);  excerpts; Online free to borrow 
 
Sharecroppers All (University of North Carolina Press, 1941, co-authored with Ira De Augustine Reid)
Tenants of the Almighty (University of North Carolina Press, 1943)
Rural Development in Action (Cornell University Press, 1970)
"Some Effects of Land Reform in 13 Japanese Villages," Journal of Farm Economics (Vol. 33, No. 2, May 1951)
"Old Conflicts in the New South," by Ira De Augustine Reid and Arthur Raper, Virginia Quarterly Review, Spring 1940.

References

Further reading
 Mazzari, Louis. 2003. "Arthur Raper and Documentary Realism in Greene County, Georgia." Georgia Historical Quarterly 87, no. 3/4: 389-407.
 Southern Modernist: Arthur Raper from the New Deal to the Cold War, by Louis Mazzari (Louisiana State University Press, 2006)
 The War Within: From Victorian to Modernist Thought in the South, 1919-1945, by Daniel Joseph Singal (University of North Carolina Press, 1982)
 Rural Worlds Lost: The American South, 1920-1960, by Jack Temple Kirby (Louisiana State University Press, 1987)
 Speak Now Against The Day: The Generation Before the Civil Rights Movement in the South by John Egerton (University of North Carolina Press, 1994)
 "Arthur Raper," by Clifford M. Kuhn, in Encyclopedia of the Great Depression, edited by Robert S. Mcllvaine (Thomson-Gale, 2004)
 "Arthur Raper." The New Encyclopedia of Southern Culture, Volume 20: Social Class, edited by Larry J. Griffin, et al.

External links
 Arthur Franklin Raper Papers, Southern Historical Collection, UNC-Chapel Hill Library
 "Wanted: The Nation's Future of the South," by Rupert B. Vance: Virginia Quarterly Review, Autumn 1943 (contains review of Raper's Tenants of the Almighty)

1899 births
1979 deaths
People from Davidson County, North Carolina
University of North Carolina at Chapel Hill alumni
Vanderbilt University alumni
American sociologists
Agnes Scott College
People from Greene County, Georgia
People from Decatur, Georgia